The 2003 Belarusian Premier League was the 13th season of top-tier football in Belarus. The first round was postponed from April 11–12 to later dates due to heavy snowfall. The season finally started on April 18 and ended on November 9, 2003. BATE Borisov were the defending champions.

Team changes from 2002 season
Due to Premiere League expansion from 14 to 16 teams, one lowest placed team in 2002 Lokomotiv-96 Vitebsk was replaced by three best teams from 2002 First League: Darida Minsk Raion, Naftan Novopolotsk and Lokomotiv Minsk. Torpedo-MAZ Minsk changed their name to Torpedo-SKA Minsk. Darida originally was registered in Minsk suburb Zhdanovichi, while playing their games in Kuntsevschina district in Minsk. The team was renamed to Darida-TDZh Zhdanovichi (due to sponsorship from shopping center Zhdanovichi) for a few weeks in early 2003. However, after shopping center cancelled their sponsorship, team's name was changed back to Darida and official location became Minsk Raion, while team's office and stadium locations remained the same.

Overview
Gomel won their 1st champions title and qualified for the next season's Champions League. The championship runners-up BATE Borisov and 2003–04 Cup winners Shakhtyor Soligorsk qualified for UEFA Cup. Teams finished on the last two places (Lokomotiv Minsk and Molodechno-2000) relegated to the First League.

Teams and venues

Table

Results

Belarusian clubs in European Cups

Top scorers

See also
2003 Belarusian First League
2002–03 Belarusian Cup
2003–04 Belarusian Cup

External links
RSSSF

Belarusian Premier League seasons
1
Belarus
Belarus